Rutherglen is a town in South Lanarkshire, Scotland that has existed for over 800 years.

Rutherglen may also refer to:

Rutherglen, Glasgow, a royal burgh in the unitary authority of South Lanarkshire in Scotland
Rutherglen railway station
Rutherglen (UK Parliament constituency) parliamentary constituency from 1918 to 2005
Rutherglen High School
Rutherglen, Victoria, a small town in Australia, named after the Scottish burgh
Rutherglen railway station, Victoria
Rutherglen wine region
Rutherglen, Ontario, a community in Bonfield, Canada

See also
Ruther Glen, Virginia